Neyami is an unincorporated community in Lee County, in the U.S. state of Georgia.

History
A variant name was "Adams". The community had about 30 inhabitants in 1900. A post office called Adams was established in 1897, and remained in operation until 1925. The current name comes from the first two letters of the names of the three subdevelopers: Newton, Yancy and Milner.

References

Unincorporated communities in Lee County, Georgia
Unincorporated communities in Georgia (U.S. state)